Ersilia stancyki is a species of sea snail, a marine gastropod mollusk in the family Eulimidae. This species is one of two known species to exist within the genus, Ersilia.

Distribution
This species occurs in the following locations:

 Gulf of Mexico

References

External links
 To World Register of Marine Species

Eulimidae
Gastropods described in 1980